Day of the Dead is an EP by Dog Fashion Disco released in June 2004. It is named after the first track. This EP has been long out of print and copies have sold as high as $300 on eBay. Most copies are autographed as the band gave a signed copy to every fan who donated at least $3 to get their tour bus repaired. Day of the Dead has recently been re-released on iTunes and was released in the Beating a Dead Horse to Death... Again compilation.

Track listing

Credits
Todd Smith - Vocals
Jasan Stepp - Guitar
Jeff Siegel - Keyboards
Brian "Wendy" White - Bass
Mike "Ollie" Oliver - Drums
Matt Rippetoe - Saxophone & Flute

Dog Fashion Disco albums
2004 EPs